Munu Adhi (4 September 1926 – 21 June 2005) was an Indian politician of the Anna Dravida Munnetra Kazhagam and Member of the Legislative Assembly of Tamil Nadu. He served as the Speaker of the Tamil Nadu Legislative Assembly from 1977 to 1980.

Notes 

All India Anna Dravida Munnetra Kazhagam politicians
1926 births
Speakers of the Tamil Nadu Legislative Assembly
2005 deaths
Tamil Nadu politicians
Tamil Nadu MLAs 1977–1980